Margaret Frances Hobbs (née Jackson; March 15, 1909 – August 14, 1997) was an educator and political figure in British Columbia. She represented Revelstoke in the Legislative Assembly of British Columbia from 1962 to 1963 as a Co-operative Commonwealth Federation (CCF) member.

She was born in Berwick, Ontario and was educated in Manitoba. She married George Hobbs. She was elected to the provincial assembly in a 1962 by-election held following the death of her husband. She was defeated when she ran for reelection in 1963. Originally a resident of Revelstoke, Hobbs later moved to Victoria and died there in 1997.

Electoral results

References 

1909 births
1997 deaths
British Columbia Co-operative Commonwealth Federation MLAs
20th-century Canadian politicians
Women MLAs in British Columbia
20th-century Canadian women politicians